The Key of the World is a 1918 British silent romance film direcred by J.L.V. Leigh and starring Eileen Molyneux, Heather Thatcher and Eric Harrison. It was made by British Gaumont at Lime Grove Studios in Shepherd's Bush. It was based on a novel by Dorin Craig.

Cast
 Eileen Molyneux as Honesty Vethick
 Heather Thatcher as Dina Destin
 Eric Harrison as Garth Berry
 Pat Somerset as Evelyn Carew
 Lionel d'Aragon as Liston Crawley
 Cecil Morton York as Adam
 Hamilton Stewart as Earl of Carne
 Florence Nelson as Lady Boddy
 Frank Harris as Farmer Berry

References

Bibliography
 Warren, Patricia. British Film Studios: An Illustrated History. Batsford, 2001.

External links

1918 films
1910s romance films
British romance films
British silent feature films
Films shot at Lime Grove Studios
British black-and-white films
1910s English-language films
1910s British films
English-language romance films